Selenite Peak is a  summit located in Pershing County, Nevada, United States.

Description
Selenite Peak is the fifth-highest peak of the Selenite Range which is a subset of the Great Basin Ranges. This peak is set on land managed by the Bureau of Land Management, and is the highest point of the BLM's Selenite Mountains Wilderness Study Area. This landform's toponym has been officially adopted by the U.S. Board on Geographic Names.

Climate
Selenite Peak is set in the Black Rock Desert which has hot summers and cold winters. The desert is an example of a cold desert climate as the desert's elevation makes temperatures cooler than lower elevation deserts. Due to the high elevation and aridity, temperatures drop sharply after sunset. Summer nights are comfortably cool. Winter highs are generally above freezing, and winter nights are bitterly cold, with temperatures often dropping well below freezing.

Gallery

See also
 
 Great Basin

References

External links
 Weather forecast: Selenite Peak
 National Geodetic Survey Data Sheet

Mountains of Pershing County, Nevada
Mountains of Nevada
North American 2000 m summits
Mountains of the Great Basin